Way Out Here is the debut studio album by American country music singer Josh Thompson. It was released on February 23, 2010 via Columbia Records Nashville. The album's first two singles, "Beer on the Table" and the title track, charted in the Top 20 on the US Billboard Hot Country Songs chart, peaking at number 17 and number 15, respectively. "Won't Be Lonely Long", the third single, peaked at number 25 on the same chart.

Critical reception
Jessica Phillips of Country Weekly magazine gave the album three-and-a-half stars out of five, saying that Thompson "confidently celebrates the particulars of country living." Bobby Peacock of Roughstock gave a positive review, praising Thompson's voice and songwriting, saying that the album "offer[s] a crystal-clear image of who he is both musically and personally." Stephen Thomas Erlewine of Allmusic rated it three stars out of five, saying that Thompson "seems a little too clean to be rowdy" but that "the singles are the kind that gain strength with repetition."

Track listing

Personnel
Adapted from liner notes.

Glen Duncan - fiddle
Tony Harrell - Hammond B-3 organ, piano
Wes Hightower - background vocals
Mike Johnson - steel guitar
Greg Morrow - drums
David Lee Murphy - background vocals
Alison Prestwood - bass guitar
Danny Rader - acoustic guitar, banjo
Rich Redmond - percussion
Dave Ristrim - steel guitar
Adam Shoenfeld - acoustic guitar, electric guitar
Josh Thompson - lead vocals
Lisa Torres - background vocals

Chart performance
The album debuted at No. 28 on the Billboard 200 and No. 9 on the Top Country Albums chart, with 15,000 copies sold in the US.

Album

Year-end charts

Singles

References

2010 debut albums
Columbia Records albums
Josh Thompson (singer) albums
Albums produced by Michael Knox (record producer)